A Simple Death is a 1985 Soviet drama film directed by Alexander Kaidanovsky, based on Leo Tolstoy's The Death of Ivan Ilyich. It was screened in the Un Certain Regard section at the 1987 Cannes Film Festival.

Cast
 Valeriy Priyomykhov as Ivan Ilyich (voiced by Alexander Kaidanovsky)
 Alisa Freindlich as Praskovya Fyodorovna,  Ivan Ilyich's wife  
 Vytautas Paukste as Mikhail Danilovich, doctor
 Mikhail Danilov as narrator
 Karina Moritts as Liza
 E. Smirnov
 Tamara Timofeyeva as nanny
 Stanislav Churkin as priest
 Anatoli Khudoleyev as Pyotr
 A. Bukhvalov
 Vladimir Starostin
 Yuri Serov

References

External links

1985 films
1985 drama films
1980s Russian-language films
Films directed by Alexander Kaidanovsky
Films based on works by Leo Tolstoy
Films about death
Lenfilm films
Soviet black-and-white films
Soviet drama films
Russian drama films
Russian black-and-white films